The 2013 Liga Indonesia Premier Division season is the eighteenth edition of Liga Indonesia Premier Division since its establishment in 1994. The competition is managed by PT. Liga Indonesia (LI).

This season is the second season of Liga Indonesia Premier Division organised by PT.Liga Indonesia without authorisation from PSSI as it has decided to appoint the new PT. Liga Prima Indonesia Sportindo (LPIS) to organise the competition. It is then recognised by PSSI breakaway leadership under La Nyalla Matalitti.

The participant initially consists of 37 clubs, Included the four clubs that played last season at DU PT LPIS, PSIS Semarang, PSCS Cilacap, Persikabo Bogor and Persbul Buol, later added to 42 clubs, after 5 clubs, (Persipasi Bekasi, Persik Kediri, PS Madiun Putra, Persewangi Banyuwangi, and PPSM Sakti Magelang) come back from competition that held by PT. LPIS, and divided into five groups. The fixtures were released on 23 January 2013. The season kicked off on 27 January 2013 and the group stage is scheduled to conclude on 23 Juny 2013.

On 1 February 2013, PT. Liga Indonesia received resignation PSGL Gayo Lues due to lack of sponsors to support their progress in the competition this season.

On 6 February 2013, PT. Liga Indonesia disqualified PSAB Aceh Besar and Persipasi Bekasi due to administrative reason.

Teams

Stadium and locations

Personnel and kits

Coach changes

Pre-season

In-season

First round
The First round is played from 27 January 2013 to 21 Juny 2013

Group 1

Results

Group 2

Results

Group 3

Results

Group 4

Results

Group 5

Results

Second round

The 12 teams were drawn into three groups of four. Each group was played on a home-and-away round-robin basis. The winners of each group and one best runners-up advanced to the semi-final. The second round is played from 28 Juny 2013 to 30 August 2013.

Group A

Group B

Group C

Best Runner-up

Knockout stage

For this season in the knock-out stage, the 4 teams play a single-elimination tournament. The draw for the semi-finals took place on 2 September 2013 at the headquarters of the Football Association of Indonesia. All matches will play in Manahan Stadium in Surakarta, Central Java.

Bracket

Semi-finals
Play On 8 September 2013

Third-placed
Play On 14 September 2013

Final

Play On 14 September 2013

Champions

Promotion/relegation play-off

Play On 22 September 2013 in Manahan Stadium, Surakarta ( Central Java)

Season statistics

Top scorers

Own goals

Hat-tricks

 4 Player scored 4 goals
 5 Player scored 5 goals

Scoring
First goal of the season: Emile Linkers for PSIS Semarang against PSCS Cilacap (27 January 2013)
Last goal of the season: Jean Paul Boumsong for Persebaya DU (Bhayangkara) against Perseru Serui (14 September 2013)
Fastest goal of the season: 1 minutes – Irfandani for PSAP Sigli against Persisko Bangko (9 June 2013)
Widest winning margin: 11 goals
PS Bangka 11–0 PS Bengkulu (26 May 2013)
Highest scoring game: 11 goals
PS Bangka 11–0 PS Bengkulu (26 May 2013)
Most goals scored in a match by a single team: 11 goals
PS Bangka 11–0 PS Bengkulu (26 May 2013)
Most goals scored in a match by a losing team: 3 goal
Persisko Bangko 3–4 Persik Kediri (3 July 2013)
Perseta Tulungagung 3–6 Persisko Bangko (30 August 2013)
Widest home winning margin: 11 goals
PS Bangka 11–0 PS Bengkulu (26 May 2013)
Widest away winning margin: 5 goals
Persebo Bondowoso 0–5 Persebaya DU (Bhayangkara) (23 April 2013)
PPSM Sakti Magelang 0–5 PS Mojokerto Putra (11 May 2013)
Most goals scored by a home team: 11 goals
PS Bangka 11–0 PS Bengkulu (26 May 2013)
Most goals scored by an away team: 6 goals
Perseta Tulungagung 3–6 Persisko Bangko (30 August 2013)

Clean sheets
Most Clean Sheets: 12
PSIS Semarang
Fewest clean sheets: 0
PPSM Sakti Magelang

References

Second tier Indonesian football league seasons
Indonesian Premier Division seasons
2
Indonesia
Indonesia